In financial services, a broker-dealer is a natural person, company or other organization that engages in the business of trading securities for its own account or on behalf of its customers.  Broker-dealers are at the heart of the securities and derivatives trading process.

Although many broker-dealers are "independent" firms solely involved in broker-dealer services, many others are business units or subsidiaries of commercial banks, investment banks or investment companies.

When executing trade orders on behalf of a customer, the institution is said to be acting as a broker. When executing trades for its own account, the institution is said to be acting as a dealer. Securities bought from clients or other firms in the capacity of dealer may be sold to clients or other firms acting again in the capacity of dealer, or they may become a part of the firm's holdings.

In addition to execution of securities transactions, broker-dealers are also the main sellers and distributors of mutual fund shares.

Main points of activity 
 Professional participant in securities market who carries out dealer activity shall be called dealer.
 Announcing the price, the dealer is committed to announce other essential conditions of the buy-sell contract of securities: minimum and maximum number of securities subject to purchase and/or sale, as well as the term of announced price's validity.

Functions 
 All the functions of stockbroker including financial consulting
 Organization and support of turnover (liquidity), or market-making (price announcing, duty of sell and buy of security at announced price, announcing of min and max number of securities that can be bought/sold at announced price, implementing time periods when announced prices are available)
 Dealers are large financial institutions that sell securities to end users and then hedge their risk by partaking in the interdealer market. Interdealers facilitate price discovery and execution between dealers.

Regulation

United States
See: Securities regulation in the United States

In the United States, broker-dealers are regulated under the Securities Exchange Act of 1934 by the Securities and Exchange Commission (SEC), a unit of the U.S. government. All brokers and dealers that are registered with the SEC (pursuant to ), with a number of exceptions, are required to be members of the Securities Investor Protection Corporation (SIPC) (pursuant to ) and are subject to its regulations. Some regulatory authority is further delegated to the Financial Industry Regulatory Authority (FINRA), a self-regulatory organization. Many states also regulate broker-dealers under separate state securities laws (called "blue sky laws").

The 1934 Act defines "broker" as "any person engaged in the business of effecting transactions in securities for the account of others", and defines "dealer" as "any person engaged in the business of buying and selling securities for his own account, through a broker or otherwise". Under either definition, the person must be performing these functions as a business; if conducting similar transactions on a private basis, they are considered a trader and subject to different requirements.  When acting on behalf of customers, broker-dealers have a duty to obtain "best execution" of transactions, which generally means achieving the best economic price under the circumstances.

On April 28, 2004, the SEC voted unanimously to change the net capital rule which applies to broker-dealers, thus allowing those with "tentative net capital" of more than $5 billion to increase their leverage ratios.   The rule change remains in effect, though subject to modifications.

Although broker-dealers often provide investment advice to their clients, in many situations they are exempt from registration under the U.S. Investment Advisers Act of 1940, so long as (i) the investment advice is "solely incidental" to brokerage activities; and (ii) the broker-dealer receives no "special compensation" for providing the investment advice.  Both elements of this exemption must be met to rely on it.

Many broker-dealers also serve primarily as distributors for mutual fund shares.  These broker-dealers may be compensated in numerous ways and, like all broker-dealers, are subject to compliance with requirements of the Securities and Exchange Commission and one or more self-regulatory organizations, such as the Financial Industry Regulatory Authority (FINRA).  The forms of compensation may be sales loads from investors, or Rule 12b-1 fees or servicing fees paid by the mutual funds. There are several online portals that offer broker dealer assistance and search capabilities.

United Kingdom
UK securities law uses the term intermediary to refer to businesses involved in the purchase and sale of securities for the account of others.

The Financial Conduct Authority authorises and regulates companies engaging in such activity as "regulated activities" under the Financial Services and Markets Act 2000.

Japan
Securities companies are regulated by the Financial Services Agency under the Financial Instruments and Exchange Law. The "big five" are Nomura Securities, Daiwa Securities, SMBC Nikko Securities, Mizuho Securities, and Mitsubishi UFJ Securities. Most major commercial banks in Japan also maintain broker-dealer subsidiaries, as do many foreign commercial banks and investment banks.

Securities companies must be organized as kabushiki kaisha with a statutory auditor or auditing committee, and must maintain minimum shareholder equity of ¥50 million.

Largest dealer banks
Bank of America Merrill Lynch
Barclays
BNP Paribas
Citigroup
Credit Suisse
Deutsche Bank
Goldman Sachs
HSBC
JPMorgan Chase
Morgan Stanley
Nomura
Commerzbank AG
Societe Generale
The Royal Bank of Scotland
UBS
Wells Fargo
Bank of New York Mellon

See also
 Broker
 Securities market participants (United States)
 Trader (finance)
 Stockbroker
 Commodity broker
 Mutual fund
 Floor broker

References

External links
 Understanding Derivatives: Markets and Infrastructure - Chapter 3, Over-the-Counter (OTC) Derivatives Federal Reserve Bank of Chicago, Financial Markets Group

Brokerage firms
Financial markets
Fixed income